Ekenäs is a town and former municipality in Finland that comprised the former municipalities of Snappertuna and Tenala together with the town of Ekenäs. It was merged with Pohja and Karis to form the new municipality of Raseborg on January 1, 2009. Ekenäs is in the province of Southern Finland, and is part of the Uusimaa region. The town is bilingual, with the majority being Swedish speakers (81%), and the minority Finnish speakers (17%).

History
Ekenäs is Finland's seventh oldest town and the first of the non-medieval towns. King Gustav Wasa granted town rights to Ekenäs on 15 December 1546, but even before that Ekenäs played a significant role in maritime transport. Today it is mostly noted for its archipelago, part of which is the Ekenäs Archipelago National Park. The old, mainly wooden town center is protected due to its cultural historical value, and renovation of even residential buildings is strictly controlled. The history of the old town dates back to 16th century, but most of the current buildings have been built between 18th and 19th century. The present Neoclassical form of the Ekenäs church was designed by Italian-born architect Charles Bassi in 1839–1842 following a fire in 1821. There are two buildings in Ekenäs designed by world famous Finnish architect Alvar Aalto; the Ekenäs Savings Bank (1964) and Villa Skeppet (1969), the home of Aalto's biographer, Göran Schildt.

Ekenäs is home of the oldest still functional movie theatre in Finland called Bio Forum. The theatre is located in the old town centre in a small Art nouveau (Jugend) building and it was founded in 1912. At the time it was called Ekenäs Nya Biograf Teater.

Notable people
Among notable residents are author Marianne Alopaeus, who wrote in Swedish. She was born in Ekenäs in 1918. One of the most renowned finnish modernist painters Helene Schjerfbeck spend her summers 1918-1920 in Ekenäs and lived in the town permanently 1925-1941. Ekenäs museum center Ekta has a permanent exhibition of her work called Helene Schjerfbeck's Life and Art.

Emma Engdahl-Jägerskiöld, one of Finland's first internationally-recognised opera singers grew up in, and always retained a close connection with, Ekenäs.

Kaija Saarikettu, violinist and Professor at Sibelius Academy, was born in Ekenäs.

Sub-region of Uusimaa 

Ekenäs was also the name of a sub-region of Uusimaa, containing the following municipalities before 2009:

 Ekenäs
 Hanko
 Ingå
 Karis
 Pohja

See also
 Bromarv
 Fiskars, Finland

References

Gallery

External links 

Populated places established in 1546
Populated places disestablished in 2009
2009 disestablishments in Finland
Former municipalities of Finland
Raseborg
Grand Duchy of Finland
1546 establishments in Europe
16th-century establishments in Finland